Gabriel de Rochechouart de Mortemart, Duke of Mortemart (1600 – 26 December 1675) was a French nobleman and father of the Marquise de Montespan. He was a friend of the French King Louis XIII.

Biography

Gabriel de Rochechouart de Mortemart was the son of Gaspard de Rochechouart de Mortemart, Marquis of Mortemart, and of Louise de Maure, suo jure Countess of Maure. His younger brother, Louis de Rochechouart de Mortemart, died without children in 1669. 

He spent a great part of his childhood with the future king of France Louis XIII, until the assassination of the latter's father, Henry IV, in 1610. In 1630, he was named the First Gentleman of the Chamber to Louis XIII, which entitled him to a pension of 6000 livres. He also maintained the confidence of the powerful Cardinal Richelieu and was an intimate of the Spanish-born queen, Anne of Austria. 

He and his some of his descendants cultivated what became known as the esprit Mortemart, a particular type of wit which allowed impossible things to be said. 

He was popular at the royal court, although his brother Louis and his cousin François de Rochechouart had been banished for their involvement in the Day of the Dupes in November 1630, when the enemies of Cardinal Richelieu mistakenly believed that they had succeeded in persuading Louis XIII to dismiss Richelieu from power.

In 1632, he married Diane de Grandseigne (1615 – 11 February 1666), the daughter of Jean de Grandseigne, Marquis de Marsillac, and of Catherine de La Béraudière, dame de Villenon. 

A year after his marriage, he was created a Knight of the Orders of the King. 

During his infancy, till he succeeded his father, he was known as the Marquis de Vivonne, a subsidiary title which was raised to a duchy in 1668.

When his father died in 1643, he took the title of Marquis de Mortemart.  

On 23 December 1663, Louis XIV raised the Marquisate of Mortemart, to a duchy. The same day, Anne de Noailles became Duke of Noailles; the two families were united in 1723 when Gabriel's grandson, Louis Alexandre de Bourbon, Count of Toulouse, the son of Madame de Montespan, married a granddaughter of Anne, Marie Victoire de Noailles. 

In 1669, he was named Governor of Paris. 

Gabriel de Rochechouart de Mortemart died in Paris on 26 December 1675.

Arms
Parti de trois et coupé de un, qui font huit quartiers: 1, de gueules au croissant de vair (Maure); 2, d'azur à trois fleurs de lys d;or au bâton de gueules (Bourbon); 3, de gueules a neuf mâcles d'or (Rohan); 4, burelé d'argent et d'azur à trois chevrons de gueules (La Rochefoucauld); 5, d'argent à la guivre d'azure engoulant un enfant au naturel (Milan); 6, de gueules aux chaînes posées en croix, sautoir et orle d'or (Navarre); 7, de gueules au pal de vair (des Cars); 8, d'hermine plain (Bretagne); sur le tout, fascé-ondé-enté d'argent et de gueules (Rochechouart).

Issue

References

Gabriel
1600 births
1675 deaths
1
17th-century French people
17th-century peers of France
Peers created by Louis XIV